Ribeira Prata is a settlement in the northwestern part of the island of São Nicolau, Cape Verde. In 2010 its population was 343. It is situated near the north coast, 3 km northeast of Praia Branca and 11 km north of Tarrafal de São Nicolau.

See also
List of villages and settlements in Cape Verde

References

Villages and settlements in São Nicolau, Cape Verde
Tarrafal de São Nicolau